The Ministry of Minor Export Crop Promotion is the Sri Lankan government ministry responsible for “leading the spice industry to achieve the excellence in cultivation, production, marketing and promotion.”

List of ministers

The Minister of Minor Export Crop Promotion is an appointment in the Cabinet of Sri Lanka.

Parties

See also
 List of ministries of Sri Lanka

References

External links
 Ministry of Minor Export Crop Promotion
 Government of Sri Lanka

Minor Export Crop Promotion
Minor Export Crop Promotion
Foreign trade of Sri Lanka
Agriculture in Sri Lanka